Unsent Letter may refer to:

Film
 The Unsent Letter, a 1959 film directed by Mikhail Kalatozov

Music
 "Unsent Letter", a song on the Machine Gun Fellatio album Bring It On!
 Unsent Letters, an album by Pete Samples
 "The Unsent Letter", a song on The Strange Boys album Be Brave

See also
 Letter Never Sent (disambiguation)